was a railway station on the Iwaizumi Line in Iwaizumi, Iwate, Japan, operated by East Japan Railway Company (JR East).

Lines
Iwaizumi Station was the terminus of the Iwaizumi Line, and was located 38.4 rail kilometers from the starting point of the line at Moichi Station.

Station layout
The station had a single side platform serving traffic in both directions, connected to a two-story station building. The platform was designed as an island platform as there were plans to connect the station to the Kita Rias Line, but no track was laid on one side of the platform.

History
Iwaizumi Station opened on 6 February 1972. The station was absorbed into the JR East network upon the privatization of the Japanese National Railways (JNR) on 1 April 1987. Operations on the Iwaizumi Line were suspended from July 2010, due to a landslide, and the line was officially closed on 1 April 2014, owing to declining passenger use.

Passenger statistics
In fiscal 2010, the station was used by an average of 14 passengers daily (boarding passengers only). The passenger figures for previous years are as shown below.

Surrounding area
 Iwaizumi Town Hall
 Iwaizumi Post Office

Bus Stop
Below-mentioned bullet point summary are bus routes and destinations.

Iwaizumi bashi bus stop
 This bus stop is passed through by Northern Iwate Transportation, Higashinihon Kotsu and JR Bus Tohoku.
Hayasaka Kogen Line (JR Bus Tohoku)
For Morioka Station
Iwaizumi-Moichi Line (Higashinihon Kotsu)
For Miyako Station via Moichi Station
A45 (Northern Iwate Transportation)
For Iwaizumi-Omoto Station
 Iwaizumi Town Bus
Kokkyo Arasawa Line
For Kami-Kokkyo
Akkadō Line
For Akkadō
Sawanaka-Natsubushi Line
For Muroba

References

External links
 

Stations of East Japan Railway Company
Railway stations in Iwate Prefecture
Iwaizumi Line
Defunct railway stations in Japan
Railway stations in Japan opened in 1972
Railway stations closed in 2014